Rhos or Rhôs may refer to these places in Wales:

Settlements
Rhos, Neath Port Talbot, South Wales Valleys
Rhos-on-Sea, Colwyn Bay, Conwy County Borough
Rhosllannerchrugog, Wrexham County Borough, northeast Wales

Defunct entities
Rhos (north Wales), a cantref and, prior to that, a small kingdom in mediaeval mid-north Wales
Rhos (south Wales), later the Hundred of Roose, a cantref around Milford Haven in southwest Wales
Rhos railway station (1848–1855), Rhosllanerchrugog
Rhos (GWR) railway station (1901–1963), Rhosllanerchrugog

See also
Rhoose, a village in Glamorgan, Wales
 Roose, a suburb of Barrow-in-Furness, Cumbria, England
 Roose Hundred, a mediaeval area of Pembrokeshire, Wales
 Rose (disambiguation)